Bethany (postcode 5352) is a small village about 2 km south-east of Tanunda in the Barossa Valley. It was originally named Bethanien or sometimes  Neu Schlesien – New Silesia, but was changed during the First World War in an attempt to remove all German place names from Australia. Similarly, the German-language school was forced to close by the state government in 1917, with 60 students at the time.

Bethany was the first settlement in the Barossa Valley area. It was settled in 1842, by Prussian immigrants who had leased land from George Fife Angas. The large portion of these initial settlers had arrived in 1841, with Pastor Gotthard Fritzsche on the Skjold.

References

External links
 
 History of Bethany

Towns in South Australia
Barossa Valley
Populated places established in 1842
German-Australian culture
Silesian diaspora